Shelton College was a private, Christian, liberal arts college that was located in Cape May, New Jersey. It was involved in a landmark case requiring religious schools to acquire a state license to grant academic degrees.

The college motto was "Training Christian Warriors."

History
Shelton College was founded by Don Odell Shelton in 1907 as the National Bible Institute of New York City, and it was incorporated in 1908. The Union Missionary Training Institute of Brooklyn, founded by Lucy D. Osborn in 1885, merged with the National Bible Institute in 1916. From 1925-1952 the National Bible Institute's headquarters were located at 340 West 55th Street in New York City and was known as the National Bible Institute School and Dormitory.

Carl McIntire was instrumental in the leadership of the college from the early 1940s until it closed in 1991.

The National Bible Institute was renamed as Shelton College in 1950. The college moved to a campus in Ringwood, New Jersey, in 1953, then to Cape May, New Jersey in 1963.

In 1971 the College moved to Cape Canaveral, Florida, and then back to Cape May in 1979.

In September 1973, McIntire became Chancellor.

In New Jersey Board of Higher Education v. Shelton College, the Supreme Court of New Jersey forbade Shelton from granting degrees without a state license. The school became a certificate granting institution until it closed in 1992.

In 2014, the roof collapsed and the building was demolished.

Academic programs
 Bachelor of Arts (BA)
 Bachelor of Sacred Theology (STB)
 Bachelor of Theology (BTh)
 Bachelor of Divinity (BD)
 Bachelor of Religious Education (BRE)
 Master of Religious Education (MRE)

Notable alumni
 Edwin M. Yamauchi, historian
 Spiros Zodhiates, author and Biblical scholar
 Ronald E. Manahan, president of Grace College and Theological Seminary
 Timothy Tow, principal of Far Eastern Bible College

Notable faculty
 Jack Murray, President
 Arthur E. Steele, President
 Francis Nigel Lee, Theology
 Virginia Ramey Mollenkott, English
 Gary G Cohen, Physics

Publications
Shelton College publishes a theological journal, The Bible Today.

Leadership

References

Defunct private universities and colleges in New Jersey
Educational institutions established in 1907
Educational institutions disestablished in 1991
1907 establishments in New Jersey
1991 disestablishments in New Jersey
Education in Cape May County, New Jersey
Cape May, New Jersey
Education in Passaic County, New Jersey
Ringwood, New Jersey
Seminaries and theological colleges in New Jersey